John P. Donnelly (July 24, 1886 – May 4, 1949) was an American lawyer and politician.

Born in Milwaukee, Wisconsin, Donnelly received his bachelor's degree from Marquette University in 1907 and his law degree from Marquette University Law School in 1911. Donnelly practiced law in Milwaukee and served as an assistant district attorney for Milwaukee County from 1923 to 1932. Donnelly served in the Wisconsin State Assembly from 1915 to 1921 and was involved with the Democratic Party. Donnelly died in a hospital in Milwaukee, Wisconsin from a heart attack.

Notes

1886 births
1949 deaths
Politicians from Milwaukee
Marquette University alumni
Marquette University Law School alumni
Wisconsin lawyers
20th-century American politicians
20th-century American lawyers
Democratic Party members of the Wisconsin State Assembly